The Riverside Murder is a 1935 British crime film directed by Albert Parker and starring Basil Sydney, Judy Gunn and Zoe Davis.  A woman reporter helps an inspector solve the deaths of four financiers on the eve of a group shareout. The film was shot at Wembley Studios in London with sets designed by the art director Ralph W. Brinton. A quota quickie, it was produced and distributed by Fox Film. It is based on the 1931 novel The Six Dead Men by Belgian author Stanislas-André Steeman, which was later adapted into the 1941 French film The Last of the Six. The film shifted the setting from France to London. It marked the film debut of Alastair Sim.

Plot summary 
Robert Norman is shot dead at his home. Inspector Winton arrives on the scene to investigate the murder and finds that it has occurred shortly before an important meeting between a group of five financiers of whom Norman was one. Budding journalist Claire Haines also manages to talk her way into the house in an attempt to impress her editor by gathering exclusive news on the murder. The other financiers realize they are also in danger when another one of their number is murdered.

Inspector Winton sets a trap for the killer using one of the financiers as bait.

Cast 
Basil Sydney as Inspector Philip Winton
Judy Gunn as Claire Haines
Zoe Davis as Mrs. Harris
Alastair Sim as Police Sergeant "Mac" McKay
Reginald Tate as Hubert Perrin
Ian Fleming as Henry Sanders
Tom Helmore as Alfred Jerome
Martin Lewis as William Gregg
C. M. Hallard as Dickenson - Norman's Attorney
Aubrey Mallalieu as Robert Norman
 Ernest Borrow as Superintendent Field 
 Sidney Monckton as Globe Reporter 
 Albert Parker as Film Director

References

Bibliography
 Chibnall, Steve. Quota Quickies: The Birth of the British 'B' Film. British Film Institute, 2007.
 Low, Rachael. Filmmaking in 1930s Britain. George Allen & Unwin, 1985.
 Simpson, Mark. Alastair Sim: The Real Belle of St Trinian's. The History Press, 2011.
 Wood, Linda. British Films, 1927-1939. British Film Institute, 1986.

External links 

1935 films
British crime films
1935 mystery films
1935 crime films
British black-and-white films
Films based on Belgian novels
Films directed by Albert Parker
Films set in London
British mystery films
1930s English-language films
1930s British films
Quota quickies
Films shot at Wembley Studios
Fox Film films
Films based on works by Stanislas-André Steeman